Cam "Buzz" Brainard (born Cameron Brainard) is an American voice actor, narrator and radio personality.

Career

Voice-over talent
As a voice talent, Brainard is known as the main announcer for the Disney Channel from July 2001 until March 2017. He first gained notoriety as the "smart aleck" narrator with a cult-following on the syndicated television show Maximum Exposure, also known as "Max X" which ran for two seasons from 2000 to 2002. As a sports announcer, Brainard hosted "This Week In Baseball" on FOX (taking over for the late Mel Allen) from 2000 until the show ended its run after more than 30 years in 2011. He also narrated Breed All About It for Animal Planet and was the promo voice for the TV series Friends in syndication.

Currently, Brainard is the voice of television's "World Access" on the Travel Channel, as well as many television and radio commercials. Audiences also hear his voice on more than 500 radio stations in the U.S. and Canada and growing. His formats range from AC to Hot AC, Christian Radio to Country and from Rock to Adult Hits.

Since 2017, he has been the announcer for rhythm game StepManiaX.

He is also currently the announcer for the Laff TV  network.

SiriusXM The Highway
Brainard has one of the largest daily audiences of any country music radio personality in North America, as the weekday afternoon host on "The Highway," SiriusXM radio's new country channel 56 based in Nashville. As of Winter 2014, Sirius XM had 27 million subscribers. Brainard is a 2018 CMA Award (Country Music Association) nominee for National Broadcast Personality of the Year.

With a weekly live audience, Cam "Buzz" Brainard hosts the "Music Row Happy Hour" on SiriusXM The Highway most Friday afternoons from Jimmy Buffett's Margaritaville Cafe in downtown Nashville. He is credited with discovering a number of country music hitmakers. As host of the weekly SiriusXM music discovery program "On The Horizon," Brainard showcases unsigned and up-and-coming country artists.

Los Angeles radio audiences were the first to hear "Buzz Brainard" as co-host of the Morning show on KZLA-FM. Later, he hosted the syndicated "Music City Saturday Night" show and "GAC Nights Radio" live from Nashville.

Personal life
Brainard was raised in Clio, Michigan. After graduating from Clio High School, he attended Central Michigan University. He married Sandy Brainard and has a son, Hank.

Filmography

Film

Television

Video Game

References

External links
 
 Cam "Buzz" Brainard at Sirius/XM The Highway, Nashville, TN

1962 births
Living people
People from Clio, Michigan
American male voice actors